Kaman is a town and union council of Okara District in the Punjab province of Pakistan.
It is located at 31°2'30N 73°9'0E with an altitude of 166 metres (547 feet).

References

Union councils of Okara District